Walter Silva may refer to:

Walter Silva (born 1977), Mexican baseball player
Walter da Silva (1942–2009), Brazilian footballer
Walter de Silva (born 1951), Italian car designer
Wálter Machado da Silva (born 1940), Brazilian footballer